George III (died 1639), of the Bagrationi Dynasty, was a king of Imereti from 1605 to 1639.

Biography
George was a natural half-brother of Rostom of Imereti on whose death he succeeded in 1605, but his authority was seriously challenged by the energetic prince of Mingrelia, Levan II Dadiani, whose increasing influence over the western Georgian polities George tried to restrict without any success. In 1623, Levan, with a combined Mingrelian-Abkhaziann army, inflicted a heavy defeat upon the royal troops. In his quest for allies, George established close ties with the influential eastern Georgian noble Giorgi Saakadze who employed an Imeretian force in his struggle against King Teimuraz I of Kakheti. After Saakadze's defeat in 1626, George made an alliance with Teimuraz and arranged a marriage between his son, Alexander (III), and Teimuraz's daughter Darejan (1629). This, however, failed to bring the feudal anarchy in Imereti to an end and the unrest continued. Later in his reign, George III once again campaigned against Levan Dadiani, but was defeated and taken captive. He was ransomed by his son Alexander, but George did not live long and died in 1639.

George III of Imereti was married to the certain Tamar (died 1639). He had four sons and one daughter:
 Alexander III (1609–1 March 1660), King of Imereti;
 Rostom;
 Mamuka (died 1654), military commander;
 Beri, Archbishop of Gelati as Svimeon Genateli (fl. 1639);
 Khvaramze (fl. 1619–1626), married to Avtandil Saakadze (died 1629), son of Giorgi Saakadze.

References

 Вахушти Багратиони (Vakhushti Bagrationi) (1745). История Царства Грузинского: Жизнь Имерети.

1639 deaths
Bagrationi dynasty of the Kingdom of Imereti
Kings of Imereti
17th-century people from Georgia (country)
Year of birth unknown
Eastern Orthodox monarchs